Real War is a 2001 video game from Simon & Schuster Interactive.

Development
The game was announced in January 2001.

Reception

The game holds a rating of 48 of 100 on Metacritic.

GameSpy gave the game a score of 54% out of 100 stating"Real War is a dud of an RTS, with a few minor strengths buried under a mountain of problems"

Sales
The game sold 300,000 copies.

References

2001 video games
Real-time strategy video games
Simon & Schuster Interactive games
Single-player video games
War video games
Windows games